Journey is a 1995 American Hallmark Hall of Fame made-for-television drama film directed by Tom McLoughlin and starring Jason Robards, Brenda Fricker and Meg Tilly. The film aired on CBS on December 10, 1995.

Plot
Jason Robards and Brenda Fricker starring as grandparents Marcus and Lottie who pick-up the pieces left behind by their restless daughter Min (Meg Tilly). When Min deserted her children and the family farm, her son Journey (Max Pomeranc) has nothing left but confusion. Despite gentle wisdom and help from his older sister Cat (Eliza Dushku), Journey cannot understand why his beloved family doesn't always live up to his expectations. Using his love of photography, Marcus recaptures Journey's past, and through love and determination, helps him understand that family is really just people who love you.

Cast
Jason Robards as Marcus
Brenda Fricker as Lottie
Max Pomeranc as Journey
Eliza Dushku as Cat
Meg Tilly as Min
Jason Dohring as Cooper McDougall
Frances Conroy as Fiona

External links

1995 films
1995 television films
1995 drama films
Films about families
Hallmark Hall of Fame episodes
CBS network films
Films directed by Tom McLoughlin
American drama television films
1990s American films